Shakespeare's Pizza, founded in 1973, is a Columbia, Missouri landmark known for its popular pizza and unconventional decor.  Its original location is at the intersection of 9th and Elm in downtown Columbia, across the street from the campus of the University of Missouri.  In November 2010, Shakespeare's was the winner of “Best Bites Challenge: College Edition” on ABC's Good Morning America. In 2019, Shakespeare's won the Barstool Sports One Bite Pizza Contest.

Locations
Shakespeare's Pizza has three locations in Columbia, Missouri. The original restaurant was located at 9th and Elm. It has since reopened in a new building at the same location. Much of the decor and some of the old building materials were re-used in the new building. The second location opened in 2004 and is often referred to as Shakespeare's West and is located at the corner of West Broadway and Broadfield Drive, on the west side of the town. A third location (Shakespeare's South) opened on Peachtree Drive, off of Providence Road on the south side of Columbia in 2012. On April 1, 2015 it was announced that the iconic downtown location would be demolished and reconstructed with additional student housing built atop. The renovated downtown location reopened in 2016.

Frozen Pizza

Frozen Shakespeare's Pizza is available at grocery stores in Columbia, Mid-Missouri, Kansas City, St. Louis, and Springfield. Frozen Shakespeare's Pizza is also available for purchase online and ships to 23 states (including Missouri). Shakespeare’s Frozen is also a popular fundraiser throughout the Midwest.

References

External links
Shakespeare’s Pizza wins "Good Morning America" challenge, Columbia Tribune, 21 November 2010
Shakespeare's Pizza-Columbia (Downtown) River Front Times, Retrieved 12 January 2011
Shakespeare's Pizza Coming To A Grocery Store Near You, KPLR 11 St. Louis, 3 March 2010

Pizzerias in the United States
Companies based in Columbia, Missouri
Restaurants in Columbia, Missouri
Tourist attractions in Columbia, Missouri
Restaurants established in 1973
1973 establishments in Missouri
Drinking establishments in Missouri